6-phosphofructokinase, muscle type is an enzyme that in humans is encoded by the PFKM gene on chromosome 12. 
Three phosphofructokinase isozymes exist in humans: muscle, liver and platelet. These isozymes function as subunits of the mammalian tetramer phosphofructokinase, which catalyzes the phosphorylation of fructose-6-phosphate to fructose-1,6-bisphosphate. Tetramer composition varies depending on tissue type. This gene encodes the muscle-type isozyme. Mutations in this gene have been associated with glycogen storage disease type VII, also known as Tarui disease. Alternatively spliced transcript variants have been described.[provided by RefSeq, Nov 2009]

Structure

Gene 
This gene is found on chromosome 12. The coding region in PFKM only shares a 68% similarity with that of the liver-type PFKL.

Protein 
This 85-kDa protein is one of two subunit types that comprise the seven tetrameric PFK isozymes. The muscle isozyme (PFK-1) is composed solely of PFKM.
The liver PFK (PFK-5) contains solely the second subunit type, PFKL, while the erythrocyte PFK includes five isozymes composed of different combinations of PFKM and PFKL. These subunits evolved from a common prokaryotic ancestor via gene duplication and mutation events. Generally, the N-terminal of the subunits carries out their catalytic activity while the C-terminal contains allosteric ligand binding sites. In particular, the binding site for the PFK inhibitor citrate is found in the PFKL C-terminal region.

Function 
This gene encodes one of three protein subunits of PFK, which are expressed and combined to form the tetrameric PFK in a tissue-specific manner. As a PFK subunit, PFKL is involved in catalyzing the phosphorylation of fructose 6-phosphate to fructose 1,6-bisphosphate. This irreversible reaction serves as the major rate-limiting step of glycolysis.

Though the PFKM subunit majorly incorporates into muscle and erythrocyte PFKs, PFKM also is expressed in the heart, brain, and testis.

Clinical significance 
As the erythrocyte PFK is composed of both PFKL and PFKM, this heterogeneic composition is attributed with the differential PFK activity and organ involvement observed in some inherited PFK deficiency states in which myopathy or hemolysis or both can occur, such as glycogenosis type VII, also known as Tarui disease. Notably, mutations in PFKM have been shown to cause Tarui disease due to homozygosity for catalytically inactive M subunits. PFKM is confirmed to be involved in muscle PFK deficiency with early-onset hyperuricemia.

Even though PFKM functions to drive glycolysis, its overexpression has been associated with type 2 diabetes and insulin resistance in skeletal muscle. One possible explanation suggests that the overexpression is meant to compensate for the allosteric inhibition of PFK1 as a result of excess oxidation of free fatty acids and accumulation of citrate and acetyl-CoA.

Interactions 
PFKM has been shown to interact with ATP6V0A4.

Interactive pathway map

See also 
PFK
PFK-1
PFKL
PFKP

References

Further reading